Song Chang-sik (Hangul: 송창식; born 2 February 1947) is a South Korean singer-songwriter, who is considered one of the country's most important and influential musicians of the 1960s and 1970s. He debuted in 1968 as a member of the folk duo Twin Folio, and is credited as being in the vanguard of the early South Korean folk-rock scene.

Biography
Song was born in 1947 in Incheon. He lost his father during the Korean War, and he lost her mother after three years he lost his father. Song first dreamed of being a singer when he was in 6th grade after having seen a performance of the orchestra at the hall of Incheon Commercial Girls' High School.

Honors 
In 2012, Song was given the Order of Cultural Merit by the South Korean government, who referred to him as the "Godfather of Folk Rock."

Awards

References

Living people
South Korean male singers
South Korean singer-songwriters
South Korean folk rock musicians
1947 births
South Korean male singer-songwriters